The 2011 FIBA Europe Under-16 Championship for Women Division B was the 8th edition of the Division B of the European basketball championship for women's national under-16 teams. It was played in Arad, Romania, from 11 to 21 August 2011. Germany women's national under-16 basketball team won the tournament.

Participating teams

  (16th place, 2010 FIBA Europe Under-16 Championship for Women Division A)

Group stages

Preliminary round
In this round, the sixteen teams were allocated in four groups of four teams each. The top three qualified for the next round. The last team of each group played for the 13th–16th place in the classification games.

Group A

Group B

Group C

Group D

Qualifying round
The twelve teams remaining were allocated in two groups of six teams each. The four top teams advanced to the quarterfinals. The last two teams of each group played for the 9th–12th place.

Group E

Group F

Classification round
The last teams of each group in the preliminary round will compete in this Classification Round. The three teams will play in one group. The last two teams will be relegated to Division C for the next season.

Group G

Knockout round

Championship

Quarterfinals

Semifinals

Bronze medal game

Final

5th–8th playoffs

5th–8th semifinals

7th place playoff

5th place playoff

9th–12th playoffs

9th–12th semifinals

11th place playoff

9th place playoff

Final standings

External links
Official Site

References

2011
2011–12 in European women's basketball
2011–12 in Romanian basketball
International youth basketball competitions hosted by Romania
International women's basketball competitions hosted by Romania
2011 in youth sport
2011 in Romanian women's sport